The British Journal of Sociology of Education is a peer-reviewed academic journal in the fields of education and sociology. According to the Journal Citation Reports, the journal has a 2016 impact factor of 1.324.

References

External links
 

Education journals
English-language journals
Taylor & Francis academic journals
Sociology journals
Sociology of education
Publications established in 1980
8 times per year journals